Kristian Johannson, (December 25, 1907 – March 9, 1984) was a Norwegian ski jumper who competed in the late 1920s and early 1930s. He won two ski jumping medals at the FIS Nordic World Ski Championships with one gold (1934) and one silver 1929.

External links
 

1907 births
1984 deaths
Norwegian male ski jumpers
FIS Nordic World Ski Championships medalists in ski jumping
Norwegian people of Swedish descent
20th-century Norwegian people